Laura McPhee (born 1958) is an American photographer known for making detailed large-format photographs of the cultural landscape—images which raise questions about human impacts on the environment and the nature of our complex and contested relationship to the earth.

Early life and education 
Laura McPhee grew up in central New Jersey, the oldest daughter of Pulitzer Prize-winning author John McPhee and photographer Pryde Brown. She has four sisters: novelists Jenny McPhee and Martha McPhee; architectural historian, Sarah McPhee; and Joan Sullivan, CEO of the Partnership for LA Schools.

McPhee earned a Bachelor of Arts in Art History from Princeton University in 1980, and a Master of Fine Arts in Photography from the Rhode Island School of Design in 1986.

Career
She is a professor at the Massachusetts College of Art and Design.

Some of her achievements include a Fulbright Scholars Fellowship to work in India and Sri Lanka, a residency in the Sawtooth Valley of central Idaho from the Alturas Foundation, a New England Foundation for the Arts Fellowship, and a John Simon Guggenheim Memorial Foundation Fellowship. Her work is in the collections of the Metropolitan Museum of Art, the Los Angeles County Museum of Art and the Getty Center, the Boston Museum of Fine Arts, the San Francisco Museum of Modern Art, and the Whitney Museum of American Art, among many others.

Work 
McPhee is noted for her large-scale photographs of landscapes and portraits of people who live and work in them. McPhee's work is concerned with place and the ways we define and manage our relationship to the land. McPhee's work has been exhibited both in the United States and abroad.

Her body of work River of No Return was exhibited at the Boston Museum of Fine Arts in 2006 and at Kansas City's Kemper Museum of Contemporary Art in 2013. A monograph of the same title was published by Yale University Press in 2008. Her first monograph, No Ordinary Land (in collaboration with Virginia Beahan) was published by Aperture in 1998.

McPhee's most recent book, published by Yale University Press in 2014,The Home and the World: A View of Calcutta, explores the weight of colonialism through images of the architecture of that city and portraits of passersby. An essay by Alan Thomas about this work appears in Places Journal.

Exhibitions 
1994 – Photographer's Gallery, London, England
1995 – pARTs Gallery, Minneapolis, MN
1995 – Rose Art Museum, Brandeis University, Waltham, MA
1998 – Laurence Miller Gallery, New York, NY
1999 – No Ordinary Land, Burden Gallery, Aperture, New York, NY
1999 – No Ordinary Land, Massachusetts College of Art, Boston, MA
1999 – No Ordinary Land, Carnegie Museum of Art, Pittsburgh, PA
2001 – No Ordinary Land, Columbus Art Museum, Columbus, OH
2001 – No Ordinary Land, Teton Regional, Jackson, Wyoming
2001 – No Ordinary Land, Cornell University Art Museum, Ithaca, New York
2002 – No Ordinary Land, Vision Gallery, Jerusalem, Israel
2002 – Interior Calcutta, II Gabbiano Gallery, Rome, Italy
2004 – The Home and the World, Bernard Toale Gallery, Boston, MA
2005 – No Ordinary Land, Sam Noble Museum, Norman, OK
2005 – Kolkata, Bonni Benrubi Gallery, New York, NY
2006 – Silent Steps, Bernard Toale Gallery, Boston, MA
2006 – River of No Return - Museum of Fine Arts Boston
 2007 – River of No Return, Boise Art Museum, Boise, ID, 2007 (solo) Gail Severn Gallery, Ketchum, Idaho
 2008 – Two Canyons, Two Years Later, Bernard Toale Gallery, Boston, MA
 2008 – River of No Return, Gail Gibson Gallery, Seattle WA
 2009 – Guardians of Solitude, Bonni Benrubi Gallery, New York, NY
 2009 – Guardians of Solitude, Gail Severn Gallery, Ketchum, ID
 2011 – River of No Return, Navarro Gallery, Southwest School of Art, San Antonio TX 2011 White Clouds, Gail Severn Gallery, Ketchum, ID
 2011 – When We Talk About Love, Carroll & Sons, Boston, MA
 2012 – Push - G. Gibson Gallery, Seattle, WA
 2012 – Looking Back at Earth: Contemporary Environmental Photography from the Hood Museum of Art's Collection, Dartmouth College, Hanover, NH
 2012 – A Generous Medium: Photography at Wellesley College, 1972-2012, Davis Museum, Wellesley, MA, 2012
 2012 – America In View: Photography from 1865 to Now, Rhode Island School of Design Museum, Providence, RI
 2013 – River of No Return - Kemper Museum of Contemporary Art, Kansas City, MO
 2015 – The Home and the World: a View of Calcutta, Gail Severn Gallery, Ketchum, ID
 2015 – The Home and the World: a View of Calcutta, Carroll and Sons Gallery, Boston, MA
 2015 – The Home and the World: a View of Calcutta, Benrubi Gallery, New York, NY
 2016 – Selections, Bakalar & Paine Galleries, Massachusetts College of Art, Boston, MA
 2016 – Big: Photographs from the Collection, The Cleveland Museum of Art, Cleveland, OH
 2016 – Changing Frontiers, The Chrysler Museum of Art, Norfolk, VA
 2017 – Samuel F.B. Morse's Gallery of the Louvre and the Art of Invention, The Peabody Essex Museum, Salem, MA
 2018 – Ansel Adams in Our Time, The Boston Museum of Fine Arts, Boston, MA
 2019 –  Women Take the Floor, The Boston Museum of Fine Arts, Boston, MA
 2020 –  Mirage: Energy, Water and Creativity in the Great Basin, Boise Art Museum, Boise, ID
 2020 – Loosely Stated, ROSEGALLERY, Santa Monica, CA
 2021 – What We Do in The Shadows, deCordova Sculpture Park and Museum, Lincoln, MA
 2021 – Ansel Adams in Our Time, Portland Art Museum, Portland, OR
 2021 –  The Expanded Landscape, The Getty, Los Angeles, CA

Publications

Publications authored by Laura McPhee 
 1998 - No Ordinary Land, Laura McPhee and Virginia Beahan, Aperture 
 2000 - Girls: Ordinary Girls and Their Extraordinary Pursuits, Laura McPhee, Jenny McPhee and Martha McPhee, Random House 
 2008 - River of No Return, Laura McPhee, Yale University Press 
 2009 - Guardians of Solitude, Laura McPhee, 
 2011 - Gateway: Visions for an Urban National Park,  
 2014 - The Home and the World: A View of Calcutta, Laura McPhee, Yale University Press
2018 - Lost, Laura McPhee, Kris Graves Projects.

Publications including photographs by Laura McPhee 

 1996 - Flesh and Blood: Photographers’ Images 
 2018 - Eye on the West: Photography and the Contemporary West, George Miles, Yale University Press, ISBN 9780300232851
 2018 - The Photographer in the Garden, Sarah Anne McNear, Jamie M. Allen, Aperture, ISBN 9781597113731

Grants and awards 
 1980 – Page Award for Exceptional Achievement in the Visual Arts, Princeton University
 1984 – New Jersey Council for the Arts Grant
 1991, 1990, 1988 – Polaroid Artists Support Grant, Polaroid Corporation
 1993 – John Simon Guggenheim Memorial Foundation Fellowship
 1995 – New England Foundation for the Arts Fellowship
 1998 – Fulbright Scholars' Fellowship to India and Sri Lanka
 2003–2004 – Alturas Foundation (Commission)
 2006 – Peter Reed Foundation Grant
 2007 – Camargo Foundation (Residency), Cassis, France
 2008–2009 — Van Alen Institute (Commission), New York
 2004, 2009 – Massachusetts College of Art and Design Faculty Fellowship

References

External links 

Laura McPhee Photographs of the American West. Yale Collection of Western Americana, Beinecke Rare Book and Manuscript Library.

American photographers
1958 births
Living people
Princeton University alumni
Rhode Island School of Design alumni
Massachusetts College of Art and Design faculty
American women photographers
American women academics
21st-century American women